The 2019 East Lindsey District Council election took place on 2 May 2019 to elect all members of East Lindsey District Council in England. The Conservatives retained overall control of the council.

Results

|-
| 
| Skegness Urban District Society
| align="right"| 6
| align="right"| 6
| align="right"| 0
| align="right"| +6
| align="right"| 10.91
| align="right"| 9.38
| align="right"| 3,950
| align="right"| +9.38%
|-
|-
| 
| No Label
| align="right"| 1
| align="right"| 1
| align="right"| -
| align="right"| +1
| align="right"| 1.82
| align="right"| 2.21
| align="right"| 929
| align="right"| +0.68%
|-

Council composition
Following the last election in 2015, the composition of the council was:

After the election, the composition of the council was:

IND - Independent 
Lab - Labour 
LI - Lincolnshire Independents 
LD - Liberal Democrats
SUDS - Skegness Urban District Society
NL - No Label

Ward results
Incumbent councillors are denoted by an asterisk (*). References -

Alford

Devereux was previously elected as a Lincolnshire Independents councillor.
A total of 66 ballots were rejected.

Binbrook

A total of 32 ballots were rejected.

Burgh Le Marsh

A total of 7 ballots were rejected.

Chapel St Leonards

 
 

A total of 76 ballots were rejected.

Coningsby & Mareham

Foster was previously elected as an Independent Councillor.

Croft

A total of 6 ballots were rejected

Friskney

Dickinson was previously elected as a UKIP councillor. A total of 8 ballots were rejected.

Fulstow

A total of 9 ballots were rejected.

Grimoldby

A total of 8 ballots were rejected.

Hagworthingham

A total of 54 ballots were rejected.

Halton Holegate

A total of 9 ballots were rejected.

Holton Le Clay & North Thoresby

Aldridge was previously elected as a Lincolnshire Independent Councillor.

Horncastle

A total of 29 ballots were rejected.

Ingoldmells

A total of 3 ballots were rejected.

Legbourne

A total of 25 ballots were rejected.

Mablethorpe

Brown was previously elected as a UKIP councillor. A total of 47 ballots were rejected.

Marsh Chapel & Somercotes

A total of 13 ballots were rejected.

North Holme

A total of 5 ballots were rejected.

Priory & St James 

 

A total of 13 ballots were rejected.

Roughton

A total of 41 ballots were rejected.

Scarbrough & Seacroft

A total of 14 ballots were rejected.

Sibsey & Stickney

 

A total of 77 ballots were spoiled.

Spilsby

A total of 9 ballots were rejected.

St Clements

Dannatt was previously elected as a UKIP Councillor. A total of 10 ballots were rejected.

St Margarets

A total of 6 ballots were rejected.

St Marys

A total of 4 ballots were rejected.

St Michaels

A total of 4 ballots were rejected.

Sutton on Sea

 

A total of 115 ballots were rejected.

Tetford & Donington

A total of 13 ballots were rejected.

Tetney

A total of 3 ballots were rejected.

Trinity

A total of 5 ballots were rejected.

Wainfleet

A total of 35 ballots were rejected.

Willoughby with Sloothby

A total of 13 ballots were rejected.

Winthorpe

Brookes was previously elected as a UKIP councillor. A total of 26 ballots were rejected.

Withern & Theddlethorpe

A total of 28 ballots were rejected.

Woodhall Spa

 

A total of 46 ballots were rejected.

Wragby

A total of 25 ballots were rejected.

By-elections

Chapel St. Leonard's

Halton Holegate

References

2019 English local elections
May 2019 events in the United Kingdom
2019
2020s in Lincolnshire